The 2017–18 Jacksonville Dolphins women's basketball team represents Jacksonville University in the 2017–18 NCAA Division I women's basketball season. The Dolphins, led by fifth year head coach Yolett McPhee-McCuin, play their home games at Swisher Gymnasium and were members of the Atlantic Sun Conference. They finish the season 24–9, 12–2 in A-Sun play finish in second place. They advanced to the championship of the 2018 Atlantic Sun women's basketball tournament where they lost to Florida Gulf Coast. They received an automatic bid to the WNIT where they lost to UCF in the first round.

On April 5, Yolett McPhee-McCuin left Jacksonville to be a head coach at Ole Miss. She finished at Jacksonville with a 5-year record of 94–63.

Media
All home games and conference road games are shown on ESPN3 or A-Sun.TV.

Roster

Schedule

|-
!colspan=9 style="background:#; color:#FFFFFF;"| Non-conference regular season

|-
!colspan=9 style="background:#; color:#FFFFFF;"| Atlantic Sun regular season

|-
!colspan=9 style="background:#; color:#FFFFFF;"| Atlantic Sun Women's Tournament

|-
!colspan=9 style="background:#; color:#FFFFFF;"| WNIT

Rankings
2017–18 NCAA Division I women's basketball rankings

See also
 2017–18 Jacksonville Dolphins men's basketball team

References

Jacksonville
Jacksonville Dolphins women's basketball seasons
Jacksonville